Onychostoma is a genus of cyprinid fish found in eastern Asia.

Species
There are currently 23 recognized species in this genus:
 Onychostoma alticorpus (Ōshima, 1920) (Taiwan ku fish)
 Onychostoma angustistomata (P. W. Fang, 1940)
 Onychostoma barbatulum (Pellegrin, 1908) (Taiwan shoveljaw carp)
 Onychostoma barbatum (S. Y. Lin, 1931)
 Onychostoma breve (H. W. Wu & J. S. T. F. Chen, 1977)
 Onychostoma daduense R. H. Ding, 1994
 Onychostoma dongnaiensis H. Đ. Hoàng, H. M. Phạm & N. T. Trần, 2015 (Dongnai srang) 
 Onychostoma elongatum (Pellegrin & Chevey, 1934)
 Onychostoma fangi Kottelat, 2000
 Onychostoma fusiforme Kottelat, 1998
 Onychostoma gerlachi (W. K. H. Peters, 1881)
 Onychostoma krongnoensis H. Đ. Hoàng, H. M. Phạm & N. T. Trần, 2015 (Krongno srang) 
 Onychostoma laticeps Günther, 1896
 Onychostoma leptura (Boulenger, 1900)
 Onychostoma lini (H. W. Wu, 1939)
 Onychostoma macrolepis (Bleeker, 1871)
 Onychostoma meridionale Kottelat, 1998
 Onychostoma minnanensis Jang-Liaw & I. S. Chen, 2013 
 Onychostoma ovale Pellegrin & Chevey, 1936
 Onychostoma rarum (S. Y. Lin, 1933)
 Onychostoma simum Sauvage & Dabry de Thiersant, 1874
 Onychostoma uniforme (Đ. Y. Mai, 1978)
 Onychostoma virgulatum Q. Xin, E. Zhang & W. X. Cao, 2009

References

 
Cyprinid fish of Asia
Cyprinidae genera
Taxa named by Albert Günther
Taxonomy articles created by Polbot